State Route 15 (SR 15) is a  state highway that travels south-to-north across the entire length of the U.S. state of Georgia, east of its centerline. This route is part of a multi two-state route 15 that begins at Florida and ends at Georgia at the North Carolina state line. It connects the Florida state line, south-southeast of Folkston with the North Carolina state line, in Dillard, via Folkston, Vidalia, Sandersville, Athens, Demorest, and Clayton.

SR 15 used to travel through Hazlehurst, Glenwood, and Dublin, which is now the path of SR 19. It used to travel from Dublin to Wrightsville, which is now the path of US 319/SR 31. It also used to travel from Athens, through Arcade and Jefferson, to Commerce, which is now the route of SR 15 Alt.

Route description
SR 15 enters Georgia just south of Folkston as a four-lane highway, along with US 1, US 23, US 301, and SR 4. In Homeland, US 301 branches off to the north while the other four routes plus SR 121, head northwest. The two state routes continue northwest through Blackshear, where they cross US 84/SR 38. After that, the two state routes continue to stay together, heading north through the community of Bristol. Soon after, SR 121 branches off to the north while SR 15 heads northwest to rejoin US 1 and SR 4 at Baxley. North of Baxley, the three highways continue, remaining a four-lane highway all the way to the Altamaha River. Approximately  past the river crossing, SR 15 branches off to the northwest again, where SR 29 begins and follows SR 15. At Vidalia, SR 15 and SR 29 turn west and follow US 280/SR 30 for several miles to the community of Higgston. The two highways head north from there through the community of Tarrytown and then on to Soperton. SR 29 heads northwest of Soperton while SR 15, along with SR 78, continues north, reaching an interchange with I-16, and goes to Adrian. The two state routes continue northwest to Wrightsville, where SR 78 departs eastward. SR 15 continues by itself through the adjacent cities of Tennille and Sandersville. Through these cites, most of SR 15 has been widened to four lanes, and it briefly picks up SR 24. North of Sandersville, SR 15 crosses SR 24/SR 540 (Fall Line Freeway) and then heads north through the community of Warthen and onto Sparta. Through Sparta, SR 15 makes a few turns, briefly picking up SR 16 and SR 22. North of Sparta, it picks up SR 77, and continues north through White Plains and Siloam. At Siloam, SR 15 has an interchange with I-20. SR 77 departs to the north while SR 15 continues northwest to Greensboro, passing beneath I-20, but without direct access. In Greensboro, SR 15 makes two more turns, briefly following US 278/SR 12 through downtown. SR 15 continues northwest to Watkinsville, after which it joins US 129/US 441. It travels together with US 441 as a mostly four-lane highway throughout the rest of their course in Georgia.

The three highways, along with several others, circle around the east side of Athens along the SR 10 Loop (Athens Perimeter Highway) and head north through the town of Nicholson and around the east side of Commerce via a bypass. The highways then have an interchange with I-85, and head between the towns of Baldwin and Cornelia, where they become a limited access freeway for a short time and rejoin US 23. The three highways remain together and head through the cities of Tallulah Falls, Clayton, and Dillard before crossing into North Carolina.

History

1920s
SR 15 was established at least as early as 1919 on three segments. The southern segment extended from the current southern terminus through Folkston, Waycross, and Alma, and ended at Hazlehurst. The central segment extended from SR 27 in Lumber City to SR 19/SR 30 west-southwest of Mount Vernon. The northern segment extended from SR 30 in Mount Vernon to Athens, through Jefferson to its current northern terminus. There was no indication if SR 15 traveled between the separate segments, though. By the end of September 1921, the portion of SR 15 from west-southwest of Mount Vernon to Wrightsville was shifted westward, to travel north-northwest to Dublin and had a separate segment from SR 26 east-northeast of Dublin to Wrightsville (again no indication of SR 15 between the two segments). Its former path from Mount Vernon to Adrian was redesignated as part of SR 56. By October 1926, US 1 was designated on SR 15 from the Florida state line to north-northeast of Alma. US 129 was designated on SR 15 from just south of Watkinsville to Jefferson. Three segments had a "completed hard surface": a portion southwest of Waycross, a portion in the south-southwest part of Athens, and the Cornelia–Clarkesville segment. By October 1929, SR 4 was designated on US 1/SR 15 from the Florida state line to north-northeast of Alma. This segment, as well as a portion south of Sandersville, had a completed hard surface.

1930s
By the middle of 1930, the southern terminus was truncated to the point it previously left the concurrency with US 1/SR 4 north-northeast of Alma. Four segments had a completed hard surface: a portion in the northwestern part of Athens, from southeast of Jefferson to southwest of Commerce, the Baldwin–Cornelia segment, and the Clarkesville–North Carolina segment. Between November 1930 and the beginning of 1932, US 23 was designated on the Baldwin–North Carolina segment. In January 1932, SR 29 was established on SR 15's current path from US 1/SR 4 in South Thompson through Vidalia to SR 56 in Soperton. In March, the Watkinsville–Athens segment was completed. The next month, SR 24 was extended from Athens to Commerce, on what is now SR 15's. Also, the Tennille–Sandersville segment was also completed. Nearly two years later, SR 121 was established from US 84/SR 50 in Hoboken to SR 38 in Blackshear. Later that year, the southern terminus of the northern segment of SR 15 was shifted west-southwest to Dublin, to connect with its central segment. From just north of the Appling–Jeff Davis county line to Hazlehurst, SR 15 had a completed hard surface. About one year later, the Johnson County portion of the Dublin–Wrightsville segment was completed. During the first half of 1936, two segments of SR 15 were completed: the Laurens County portion of the Dublin–Wrightsville segment and a short portion south-southeast of Baldwin. Later that year, the northern half of the Homer–Baldwin segment was completed. By the end of the year, the Treutlen County portion of the Vidalia–Soperton segment of SR 29 was also completed. In the first quarter of 1937, SR 78 was established from Soperton north to Adrian and north-northwest to Wrightsville. In the third quarter of the year, three segments of SR 15 were completed: the entire southern segment (from north of Alma to Hazlehurst), a portion north-northeast of Lumber City, and from the Hancock–Greene county line to just north-northwest of Greensboro. The next year, SR 121 was extended southward to US 1/SR 4 in Racepond and northward to Baxley. Two segments of SR 15 were completed: the Athens–Jefferson and Homer–Baldwin segments. By July 1939, the Vidalia–Soperton segment, as well as a portion in the southeastern part of Commerce, of SR 29, and a portion in the southern part of Wrightsville on SR 78, was completed. Later that year, the entire Commerce–Homer segment of SR 15, as well as the northern half of the South Thompson–Vidalia segment of SR 29, was completed. By the end of the year, all of SR 15 north of Watkinsville, as well as a portion of SR 24 in the extreme northern part of Athens, was completed.

1940s
In 1940, the Wrightsville–Tennille segment of SR 15, as well as the portion of SR 78 from Soperton to north-northwest of Adrian, was completed. In the second half of 1941, the Adrian–Wrightsville segment of SR 78 was completed. The next year, a portion of SR 15 southeast of Sparta, as well as the southern half of the South Thompson–Vidalia segment of SR 29, was completed. Between January 1945 and November 1946, US 319 was designated on the Dublin–Wrightsville segment of SR 15. Three segments of SR 15 and one segment of SR 24 were "hard surfaced": from Lumber City to north of Glenwood, from Sandersville to just south of Warthen, the Sparta–Greensboro segment, and the Jackson County portion of SR 24. By February 1948, the Sandersville–Sparta segment of SR 15, the Pierce County portion of the Hoboken–Blackshear segment of SR 121, a portion of SR 121 south-southeast of Baxley, and the entire Athens–Commerce segment of SR 24 were all hard surfaced. By April 1949, US 441 was designated on the Watkinsville–Athens and Commerce–Baldwin segments of SR 15 and the Athens–Commerce segment of SR 24. Two segments of SR 15 were hard surfaced: a portion south-southeast of Dublin and the Oconee County portion of the Greensboro–Watkinsville segment.

1950s and 1960s
By August 1950, US 23 was designated on US 1/SR 4 from the Florida state line to north of Alma and on the southern segment of SR 15 from north of Alma to Hazlehurst. The Wheeler County portion of SR 15 and the Greene County portion of its Greensboro–Watkinsville segment, as well as the Blackshear–Bristol segment of SR 121, was hard surfaced. By the beginning of 1952, US 441 was designated on US 23/SR 15 from Baldwin to the North Carolina state line. The Glenwood–Dublin segment of SR 15 and the Racepond–Hoboken and Bristol–Baxley segments of SR 121 were hard surfaced. Between July 1957 and June 1960, SR 15 was re-extended to the Florida state line, on its current path, to Wrightsville. Its former path from north of Alma to Dublin was redesignated as SR 19; its former path from Dublin to Wrightsville, on US 319, was redesignated as SR 31. The paths of SR 15 and SR 24 between Athens and Commerce were swapped. By June 1963, SR 350 was established from US 129/SR 15 in the northwestern part of Athens to US 29/SR 8 in the northeastern part of the city. SR 15 and SR 24 between Athens and Commerce were swapped back. The path of SR 15 between Tallulah Falls and Tiger was shifted southwest on a more direct path. Its former path on US 23/US 441 was redesignated as SR 343. By the beginning of 1966, SR 24's northern terminus was truncated to Watkinsville. SR 15 replaced the Watkinsville–Athens segment, and SR 15 Alt. replaced the Athens–Commerce segment. US 29 was designated on SR 350 from the US 129/SR 15 interchange, which also had US 29 Temp. and US 441 Temp., to the US 29/SR 8 interchange. US 441 Temp. was designated on it from the US 129/SR 15 interchange to the US 441/SR 15 Alt. interchange. A western extension of SR 350, ending at US 29/US 78/SR 8/SR 10, was under construction. Also, SR 350 was under construction east-southeast just slightly from the US 29/SR 8 interchange. US 23/US 441/SR 15 between Tallulah Falls and a point about halfway between Clayton and Mountain City was shifted eastward; at this time, SR 343 was decommissioned. In 1966, SR 350 was decommissioned. US 29 was designated on the freeway from the western terminus to where it, as well as SR 8, depart the freeway. This interchange also had SR 8 Bus. and SR 106. SR 8 was designated on the entire length of the freeway. Its former path through the city was redesignated as SR 8 Bus., still concurrent with US 78/SR 10. In 1967, US 29 was extended on the freeway one interchange to the east. At this interchange, SR 72 was extended southeast to end here, concurrent with US 29/SR 8.

1970s and 1980s
In 1971, the path of US 23/US 441/SR 15 in the Baldwin–Demorest area was shifted westward. Their former path became US 23 Bus./US 441 Bus./SR 15 Loop. In 1976, SR 72 was indicated to be "projected mileage" from this point south to US 78/SR 10, then southwest and west to end at US 441/SR 15. In 1980, the Athens freeway was completed along its proposed extension's path, with US 129/US 441/SR 15 designated on it. The path of SR 15 in the Clarkesville area was shifted eastward, off of US 23/US 441 and partially onto SR 115. The next year, the portion of the Athens freeway between US 29/SR 8/SR 72 and US 78/SR 10 on the northeastern part was downgraded to a divided highway. In 1983, US 129/US 441/SR 15 Alt. was designated on the freeway from the then-current southern terminus to their current respective interchanges. In 1985, US 441 Temp. was no longer shown on maps. SR 72's western terminus was truncated to the far northeastern part of the city, at its current location. In 1986, a western cut-off, designated as SR 773, was proposed on a more direct path between two intersections with US 23/US 441/SR 15 from south of Tallulah Falls and into the city. The next year, SR 10 was designated on the Athens freeway from the US 129/US 441/SR 15 to the eastern US 78/SR 10 Bus. interchange. Its old path through downtown, still concurrent with US 78, was redesignated as SR 10 Bus. At this time, SR 72 was re-extended to the northeastern interchange. The path of US 23/US 441/SR 15 in the Tallulah Falls area was shifted westward, onto the proposed path of SR 773. The former path was redesignated as SR 15 Loop. In 1988, SR 10 in Athens was shifted back to downtown, with SR 10 Loop designated on the city's freeway. US 78 was shifted to the southern side of the freeway, with its former path redesignated as US 78 Bus. A southern bypass of Demorest and Clarkesville, designated as a northern extension of SR 365, was proposed from SR 365's then-current northern terminus at US 23/US 441/SR 15 south-southeast of Demorest to SR 115 south-southeast of Hollywood. At this time, SR 365 Spur was proposed from SR 115 at SR 365's proposed extension north-northwest to Hollywood. The next year, an eastern bypass of the main part of Commerce, designated as SR 759, was proposed from US 441/SR 15 south-southeast of Commerce to another intersection north-northeast of the city. SR 365 extended east-northeast on its previously proposed path to SR 115 south-southeast of Hollywood. An eastern bypass of Hollywood and Turnerville, designated as SR 835, was proposed from SR 17 just south of Hollywood to US 23/US 441/SR 15 south-southwest of Tallulah Falls.

1990s and 2000s
In 1991, the paths of SR 15 and SR 15 Alt. between Athens and Commerce were swapped. SR 759 around Commerce was completed. An eastern bypass of Homer, designated as SR 765, was proposed from US 441/SR 15/SR 164 south-southeast of Homer to US 441/SR 15 north-northeast of the city. Also, the path of US 23/SR 15 in the Demorest–Hollywood area was shifted off of US 441 and onto SR 365 from south-southeast of Demorest to south-southeast of Hollywood, then north-northwest on the proposed path of SR 365 Spur to Hollywood. The next year, a slightly western rerouting of US 129/US 441/SR 15 in the southern part of Athens, designated as SR 901, was proposed from US 129/US 441/SR 15 southwest of their southern interchange with the Athens freeway north-northwest to Timothy Road just north of the freeway. The path of US 441/SR 15 in the Commerce area was shifted eastward, replacing SR 759. The former path of US 441, on SR 334 and SR 98, was redesignated on US 441 Bus. A southeastern bypass of Hollingsworth, designated as SR 876, was proposed from US 441/SR 15 south-southeast of Hollingsworth to SR 198 southeast of the community. A cutoff, north-northeast of Hollingsworth, was proposed as an unnumbered road from Hollingsworth to US 441/SR 15 north-northwest of it. The path of US 441, from south-southeast of Demorest to Hollywood, was shifted southeast, onto the path of US 23/US 441/SR 15/SR 365. The former path of US 441 was redesignated as a northern extension of US 441 Bus. In 1993, the path of US 23/US 441/SR 15, from Hollywood to Tallulah Falls, was shifted eastward, onto the proposed path of SR 835. The next year, the cutoff north-northeast of Hollingsworth, now proposed as SR 877, was extended to SR 105 just east of the southern end of US 441/SR 15 concurrency. In 1995, US 29/SR 8 was also shifted to the southern side of the freeway, concurrent with US 78/SR 316. SR 72's western terminus was once again truncated to its current location. In 1997, the path of US 441/SR 15, from Homer–Cornelia, was shifted eastward, onto the proposed path of SR 876. In 2001, the path of US 129/US 441/SR 15 in Athens was shifted westward, onto the proposed path of SR 901. This brief concurrency ended at Macon Highway. The next year, US 129/US 441/SR 15 was shifted off of Macon Highway and onto the Athens freeway. SR 877 was canceled. Two years later, the unsigned SR 422 designation was applied to the Athens freeway. The path of US 441/SR 15 in Homer area was shifted eastward, onto the proposed path of SR 765.

Major intersections

Special routes

Sparta connector route

State Route 15 Connector (SR 15 Conn.) was a connector route of SR 15 that existed in Sparta. Between April 1949 and August 1950, it was established from SR 16 northeast of the city to SR 15/SR 22 north of it. Between June 1955 and July 1957, the path of SR 15 in the Sparta area was shifted northeast, replacing SR 15 Conn.

Athens spur route

State Route 15 Spur (SR 15 Spur) was a very short-lived spur route of SR 15 that existed completely within the city limits of Athens. In 1952, it was established from US 441/SR 15 in the southern part of the city north-northwest to US 129/SR 15 in the western part of it. The next year, it was decommissioned.

Athens–Commerce alternate route

State Route 15 Alternate (SR 15 Alt.) is a  alternate route of SR 15. It consists of a series of streets, roads, and highways that form a south-to-north-oriented highway in Clarke and Jackson counties in the northeastern part of the state. SR 15 Alt.'s southern terminus is in Athens at the interchange of Milledge Avenue and US 29/US 78/US 129/US 441/SR 8/SR 10 Loop/SR 15 (Athens Perimeter Highway) and Macon Highway. The segment along Milledge Avenue winds by the campus of the University of Georgia. This street features stately homes and mansions, some of which house college fraternities and sororities. SR 15 Alt. follows Prince Avenue northwest after the northern end of Milledge Avenue. As SR 15 Alt. leaves Athens, it becomes concurrent with US 129, where it is known as Jefferson Road. Upon entering Jefferson, SR 15 Alt. splits from US 129 to the northeast and becomes an independent highway. Its northern terminus is in the northeastern part of the city of Commerce at its intersection with US 441 (sometimes referred to as the Commerce Bypass) and SR 59. This intersection is the north end of SR 15 Alt.'s concurrency with US 441 Bus.

The entire length of SR 15 Alt. that is concurrent with US 129, from Athens to Arcade, is part of the National Highway System, a system of routes determined to be the most important for the nation's economy, mobility, and defense.

Between June 1963 and the beginning of 1966, it was established from US 129/US 441 Temp./SR 15 in Athens north-northeast on Lumpkin Street, east-northeast on US 78/SR 8/SR 10 (Broad Street), north-northwest on Thomas Street with SR 8, curved to the north-northeast on Madison Avenue, and traveled northwest on Hobson Avenue. At US 29/US 441 Temp./SR 350, US 441 joined it in a concurrency. In Commerce, it split off of US 441 temporarily to the northeast and curved to the north-northwest to rejoin it at the spot where SR 98 also joined it. At an intersection with SR 15/SR 326, the alternate route ended. In 1966, the path of SR 8 in Athens was shifted northward onto the Athens freeway. Its former path through the city, partially on SR 15 Alt., was redesignated as SR 8 Bus.

Jackson–Banks County spur route

State Route 15 Spur (SR 15 Spur) was a spur route of SR 15 that existed on the Jackson–Banks county line, northeast of Commerce. In the second half of 1957, it was established from US 441/SR 15 just south of the county line to SR 59 just north of it. In 1981, the path of SR 59 in this area was shifted eastward, replacing all of SR 15 Spur.

Baldwin spur route

State Route 15 Spur (SR 15 Spur) was a spur route of SR 15 that existed in Baldwin. Between the beginning of 1938 and the beginning of 1951, it was established from US 441/SR 15 to US 23/SR 13. In 1972, it was redesignated as SR 15 Conn.

Baldwin connector route

State Route 15 Connector (SR 15 Conn.) was a connector route of SR 15 that existed in Baldwin. The roadway that would become SR 15 Conn. was established between the beginning of 1938 and the beginning of 1951 as SR 15 Spur from US 441/SR 15 to US 23/SR 13. In 1972, it was redesignated as SR 15 Conn. In 1981, the path of US 441/SR 15 in Baldwin was shifted westward, replacing the connector route.

Baldwin–Cornelia loop route

State Route 15 Loop (SR 15 Loop) was a very short-lived loop route of SR 15 that existed in Baldwin and Cornelia. In 1971, the path of US 23/US 441/SR 15 in the Baldwin–Demorest area was shifted westward, bypassing Cornelia. The former path was redesignated as US 23 Bus./US 441 Bus./SR 15 Loop. The next year, SR 105 was extended through the area, replacing the loop route.

Cornelia alternate route

State Route 15 Alternate (SR 15 Alt.) was an alternate route of SR 15 that existed entirely within the city limits of Cornelia. Between June 1963 and the beginning of 1966, it was established from US 23/US 441/SR 15 (Wells Street), to the northwest and north-northeast, and curved to the north-northwest on Clarkesville Street to a second intersection with US 23/US 441/SR 15. In 1972, this highway was redesignated as SR 105 Alt.

Cornelia connector route (1965–1972)

State Route 15 Connector (SR 15 Conn.) was a connector route of SR 15 that existed entirely within the city limits of Cornelia. Between June 1963 and the beginning of 1966, it was established from US 23/US 441/SR 15 east-northeast to SR 15 Alt. In 1972, this highway was redesignated as SR 105 Conn.

Cornelia connector route

State Route 15 Connector (SR 15 Conn.) is a  connector route that exists almost entirely within Cornelia. It is known locally as Level Grove Road, and is designed to facilitate northbound to southbound traffic between US 441/SR 15 and US 23/SR 365 (Tommy Irvin Parkway).

The roadway that would eventually become SR 15 Conn. was established between the beginning of 1976 and the beginning of 1982, as an extension of US 123 and SR 13. Between the beginning of 1987 and the beginning of 1995, US 123 and SR 13 were truncated off of this path, and SR 13 Conn. was designated in their place.

Cornelia spur route

State Route 15 Spur (SR 15 Spur) was a spur route of SR 15 that existed entirely within the city limits of Cornelia. Between June 1963 and the beginning of 1966, it was established on Main Street from SR 15 Alt. north-northwest to US 23/US 441/SR 15 (which also used the Main Street name). In 1972, this highway was redesignated as SR 105 Spur.

Clarkesville connector route

State Route 15 Connector (SR 15 Conn.) was a connector route of SR 15 that existed entirely within the city limits of Clarkesville. The roadway that would eventually become SR 15 Conn. was established between the beginning of 1951 and the beginning of 1962, as an unnumbered road from US 23/US 441/SR 15 northwest to US 23/US 441/SR 15/SR 115/SR 197. Between the beginning of 1966 and the beginning of 1976, SR 15 Conn. was designated on this path, but with SR 15 shifted eastward, off of the northern intersection. Between the beginning of 1987 and the beginning of 1995, SR 15 Conn. was redesignated as SR 197 Conn.

Tallulah Falls spur route

State Route 15 Spur (SR 15 Spur) was a spur route of SR 15 that partially existed in Tallulah Falls. The roadway that would eventually become SR 15 Spur was established between January and September 1938 as an unnumbered road between two intersections with US 23/SR 15. Its southern terminus was southwest of Tallulah Falls, and its northern terminus was west-northwest of it. Between the beginning of 1945 and November 1946, SR 15 Spur was designated on this road. In 1953, the northern terminus was shifted to north-northwest of the town. Between June 1954 and June 1955, its southern terminus was shifted to being south-southwest of Tallulah Falls, and its northern terminus was shifted into the town. Between June 1963 and the beginning of 1966, its southern terminus was shifted to south of town. In 1969, its southern terminus was shifted to south-southeast of town. Between the beginning of 1979 and March 1980, SR 15 Spur was decommissioned.

Tallulah Falls loop route

State Route 15 Loop (SR 15 Loop) is a  loop route of SR 15 that exists completely within the city limits of Tallulah Falls. It begins at an intersection with US 23/US 441/SR 15. The loop travels to the east and curves to the northeast to a turnoff that leads to Tallulah Lodge. It passes a U.S. Post Office for the town and Indian Springs Trading Post and curves to the north-northwest. At the Tallulah Point Overlook, it begins heading west-northwest and reaches its northern terminus, a second intersection with US 23/US 441/SR 15.

In 1987, the path of US 23/US 441/SR 15 in the Tallulah Falls area was shifted westward. Its former path was redesignated as SR 15 Loop.

See also

References

External links

 
 Georgia Roads (Routes 1 - 20)
 Georgia State Route 15 on State-Ends.com
 Georgia State Route 15 CONN on State-Ends.com

015
Transportation in Charlton County, Georgia
Transportation in Brantley County, Georgia
Transportation in Pierce County, Georgia
Transportation in Appling County, Georgia
Transportation in Toombs County, Georgia
Vidalia, Georgia, micropolitan area
Transportation in Montgomery County, Georgia
Transportation in Treutlen County, Georgia
Transportation in Emanuel County, Georgia
Transportation in Johnson County, Georgia
Transportation in Washington County, Georgia
Transportation in Hancock County, Georgia
Transportation in Greene County, Georgia
Transportation in Oconee County, Georgia
Transportation in Athens, Georgia
Transportation in Clarke County, Georgia
Transportation in Jackson County, Georgia
Transportation in Banks County, Georgia
Transportation in Habersham County, Georgia
Transportation in Rabun County, Georgia